South Korean boy band NCT 127 have embarked on two headlining concert tours. Initially debuting in July 2016, the group's current active lineup consists of members Taeil, Johnny, Taeyong, Yuta, Doyoung, Jaehyun, Jungwoo, Mark, and Haechan, with member Winwin currently active in NCT's China-based group WayV. The group held first headlining concert, Neo City – The Origin, in support of their studio albums Regular-Irregular (2018) and Awaken (2019), as well as their fourth extended play We Are Superhuman (2019). The tour spanned 45 concerts in Asia, North America, Latin America, and Europe from January 2019 until February 2020.

NCT 127 was supposed to embark on their second tour, Neo City – The Awards, in support of their second studio album Neo Zone (2020) with six concerts in North America in June 2020, however this was cancelled due to the spread of the COVID-19 pandemic. A reworked second tour promoting their third studio album Sticker (2021), Neo City – The Link, began in December 2021 in Seoul following the reopening of the Gocheok Sky Dome.

Neo City – The Origin (2019-2020)

Background 
NEO CITY – The Origin was the first solo concert tour of South Korean boy band NCT 127. The tour was officially announced on December 21, 2018 with tickets going on sale on December 27, 2018. The tour began in Seoul's KSPO Dome on January 26, 2019 and initially visited 7 cities in Asia. The world tour extension began on April 24, 2019 in Newark and toured North America, and continued in Latin America, Asia and Europe before ending in Singapore on July.

Set list

Tour dates

Live album

Personnel
 Artist: Taeil, Johnny, Taeyong, Yuta, Doyoung, Jaehyun, Jungwoo, Mark, and Haechan
 Tour organizer: SM Entertainment
 Tour promoter: Dream Maker Entertainment, SubKulture Entertainment (North America), KpopMe Entertainment (Canada), SM True (Thailand), Attack Concert (Russia), Magic Sound K-Pop (London & Paris), ONE Production (Singapore)

Neo City – The Awards

Background 
Neo City – The Awards was the planned second solo concert tour of NCT 127 in support of their second studio album, Neo Zone. The tour was officially announced on February 25, 2020 with tickets going on sale on February 28, 2020. The tour was set to begin on June 5, 2020 at Madison Square Garden, with five additional North American stops in June 2020. On May 15, 2020, it was announced that the tour had been cancelled due to the COVID-19 pandemic.

Cancelled tour dates

Neo City – The Link (2021)

References

Lists of concert tours
Lists of concert tours of South Korean artists
Lists of events in South Korea
South Korean music-related lists